The Buffalo Jr. Sabres are a Junior "A" ice hockey team from Buffalo, New York. They are part of the Ontario Junior A Hockey League. Its current general manager is Sean Wallace.

History
This franchise was established in Buffalo, New York, in 1975 when the Buffalo Jr. Sabres joined the New York/Pennsylvania Junior Hockey League, taking the place of the departing franchise West Seneca Cougars.  During its history, a half-dozen former Buffalo Sabres of the National Hockey League served as head coach or assistant coach.  Larry Mickey coached from 1977 to the end of the 1979 season.

The following year the Junior Sabres were led by Jim Lorentz.  Lorentz coached the team from the 1978-79 season to the 1981–82.  Former NHL 1st round draft choice Morris Titanic took over the team for the 1982–83 season and coached until 1985. Ric Seiling served during an assistant coach briefly.

The team continued in various leagues, including The Western New York Junior Hockey League, The North American Hockey League and the Golden Horseshoe Junior B Hockey League, before suspending operations for one season after the 1985–1986 season.  The 1985–86 season saw Buffalo balance a schedule between the Ontario Hockey Association's Golden Horseshoe league and a split season with the NAHL.

In the 1987–1988 season the team began operating again headed by Kris Hicks (Head Coach) and Chuck Giambra (General Manager). They were now known as the Niagara Scenic and were playing a full schedule in the North American Hockey League. The team moved to the Eastern Junior Hockey League for the 1994–1995 season and then joined the Metro Junior A Hockey League beginning in 1995–1996.  After the Metro folded, the Scenics moved into the Ontario Provincial Junior Hockey League beginning with the 1998-99 season.  Heading into the 1999–2000 season, the franchise renamed itself the Buffalo Lightning.  In 2005, the Lightning made a deal with the National Hockey League's Buffalo Sabres to restore the name "Junior Sabres" and again wear the Sabres' classic Blue and Gold jerseys.

In 2008 the Buffalo Jr. Sabres were bought out by the Buffalo Sabres and the Buffalo Sabres Alumni Association. Former Buffalo Sabre Larry Playfair took over as team president, while former Buffalo Sabre Grant Ledyard took the position of head coach/general manager. Michael Peca was hired as general manager prior to the 2011-12 season.

In January 2012 Ledyard stepped down from his role as head coach.  Russ Certo assumed the role of interim head coach for the remainder of the season, which included a first round playoff series victory over the Hamilton Red Wings before falling in the second round to the Oakville Blades.  Peca officially added the role of head coach to his duties at the end of the 2011-12 season.

Under Peca's leadership, the Jr. Sabres finished the 2012-13 regular season as the OJHL's West Division champions and claimed the top seed in the South-West Conference for the 2013 playoffs.  That regular season saw forward Tyler Gjurich score 53 goals and a total 97 points in 53 games, leading the entire league in points.  Goaltender Parker Gahagen registered seven shutouts among his 29 wins.  It was the first time since the 1993-94 season that the Jr. Sabres claimed first place in its division, while Gjurich became only the second player in franchise history to score 50 or more goals (the first was Brian Gionta during the 1996-97 season during the Niagara Scenic era).  The 2012-13 roster also produced seven NCAA hockey-bound prospects as of March 1, 2013: Gjurich (Maine), Gahagen (Army), Josh Kielich (Canisius College), Darrin Trebes (Fredonia State), Derek Patterson (Plattsburgh State), Nathan Pelligra (Manhattanville College) and Nolan Sheeran (Canisius College, beginning 2014-15).

On October 22, 2013, it was announced the Jr. Sabres Junior A team would be joined by six younger-level teams, also carrying the Jr. Sabres name, in an expanded program that would play at the LECOM Harborcenter, the multi-use facility being constructed by the Buffalo Sabres which opened in 2014. The team previously played at the Northtown Center.

Season-by-season results

Playoffs

MetJHL Years
1996 Lost Semi-final
Niagara Scenic defeated Aurora Tigers 4-games-to-3
Caledon Canadians defeated Niagara Scenic 4-games-to-none
1997 Lost Preliminary
Wexford Raiders defeated Niagara Scenic 4-games-to-none
1998 DNQ
OJHL Years
1999 DNQ
2000 DNQ
2001 Lost Division Quarter-final
Mississauga Chargers defeated Buffalo Lightning 4-games-to-2
2002 DNQ
2003 Lost Division Semi-final
Buffalo Lightning defeated Hamilton Kiltys 4-games-to-2
Milton Merchants defeated Buffalo Lightning 4-games-to-none
2004 Lost Division Quarter-final
St. Michael's Buzzers defeated Buffalo Lightning 4-games-to-none
2005 Lost Division Quarter-final
Oakville Blades defeated Buffalo Jr. Sabres 4-games-to-none
2006 DNQ
2007 Lost Division Quarter-final
Aurora Tigers defeated Buffalo Jr. Sabres 4-games-to-none
2008 DNQ
2009 Lost Division Quarter-final
Vaughan Vipers defeated Buffalo Jr. Sabres 3-games-to-2
2010 DNQ
2011 DNQ
2012 Lost Division Semi-final
Buffalo Jr. Sabres defeated Hamilton Red Wings 3-games-to-none
Oakville Blades defeated Buffalo Jr. Sabres 4-games-to-1

Notable alumni
Brian Gionta
Todd Marchant
Aaron Miller
Ryan Callahan
Morris Titanic – former head coach
Frank Downing Jr. – former Michigan captain
Lee Stempniak
Kevyn Adams
Ken Baker -  Entertainment Journalist

References

External links
Buffalo Junior Sabres Website

Ontario Provincial Junior A Hockey League teams
Sports in Buffalo, New York
Ice hockey teams in New York (state)
1975 establishments in New York (state)
Buffalo Sabres minor league affiliates